Adi Jambava, are artisan caste of Karnataka and Andhra Pradesh. This hilly mountain tribe worships Rama, Adi Parashakti, Shiva, Matangi and Maramma  remembrance of Jambavantha, they grow long beards and hair, wear ochre turbans, wear ashes and a horizontal shape on their foreheads known as Addagandha.

They are also related to Madiga found in Karnataka state, India. They are referred to as jambava same. The government of Karnataka has also launched a Separate Corporation Called Karnataka Adi Jambava Development Corporation for the uplift of the Adi Jambava community.

References

Social groups of Karnataka